The 2018 Kate Sheppard Cup is New Zealand's women's 25th annual knockout football competition. This is the first year that the competition is known by the Kate Sheppard Cup, or  New Zealand Football Foundation Kate Sheppard Cup for sponsorship purposes, after previously been known as the Women's Knockout Cup since its establishment.

The 2018 competition has three rounds before quarter-finals, semi-finals, and a final. Competition will run in three regions (northern, central, southern) until the quarter-finals, from which stage the draw will be open. In all, 35 teams entered the competition.

The 2018 final
The 2018 final was the first time a team from Football South played in the final with Dunedin Technical representing the region against Forrest Hill Milford from Auckland. The final was played at QBE Stadium before the men's Chatham Cup final. This was Forrest Hill Milford United's third final appearance, having won it once in 2016 and lost it previously in their first final appearance in 2014. Dunedin Technical went on to win the game 4–2 meaning it was also the first time the trophy headed to the bottom of the South Island. Shontelle Smith from Tech was the winner of the Maia Jackman trophy for the most valuable player.

Results

Round 1
All matches were played on the weekend of 12–13 May 2018.

Central/Capital Region

Mainland Region

Southern Region

All teams listed below received byes to the second round.
Northern Region: Forrest Hill Milford United, Glenfield Rovers, Norwest United, Three Kings United, Eastern Suburbs, Central United, Papakura City, Ellerslie, Onehunga Sports, Western Springs, Fencibles United, Otumoetai, Hamilton Wanderers.
Central/Capital Region: Palmerston North Marist, Wairarapa United, Wellington United, Seatoun, Upper Hutt City.
Mainland Region: Universities, Halswell United, Coastal Spirit.
Southern Region: Dunedin Technical, Otago University.

Round 2
All matches were played on Queen's Birthday weekend 2-4 June 2018.

Northern Region

Central/Capital Region

Mainland Region

Southern Region

All teams listed below received byes to the second round.
Northern Region: Papakura City, Glenfield Rovers

Round 3
All matches were played on the weekend 23-24 June 2018.

Northern Region

Central/Capital Region

Mainland/Southern Region

Quarter-finals
All matches were originally organised to be played on the weekend 14-15 July 2018 however two matches were postponed due to weather conditions, the match between Hamilton Wanderers and Forrest Hill Milford was played on the 22 July 2018 and Eastern Suburbs v Glenfield Rovers was played on 26 July 2018.

Northern Region

Central/Capital Region

Mainland/Southern Region

Semi-finals
Matches were played on the weekend 25-26 August 2018. The draw was originally done before the results of the Eastern Suburbs v Glenfield Rovers and Hamilton Wanderers v Forrest Hill Milford postponed matches where known.

Final
The final was played on the 9 September 2018.

References

External links
Women's knockout cup section on the New Zealand Football website

Women's Knockout Cup/Kate Sheppard Cup
Women's Knockout Cup
Women's Knockout Cup
Women's Knockout Cup
football